Río Negro (Spanish and Portuguese, 'Black River') may refer to:

Rivers

Brazil
 Rio Negro (Amazon), tributary of the Amazon River
 Rio Negro (Mato Grosso do Sul)
 Rio Negro (Paraná)
 Rio Negro (Rio de Janeiro)
 Rio Negro (Rondônia)
 Rio Negro (Tocantins)

South America (except Brazil)
 Río Negro (Argentina), in Patagonia
 Río Negro (Los Lagos), in Southern Chile
 Río Negro (Uruguay), tributary of the Uruguay River
 Río Negro (Chaco Province), in Argentina, tributary of the Paraná River

Central America
 Río Negro (Central America), forming part of the border between Honduras and Nicaragua
 Chixoy River, also known as the Río Negro, in Guatemala

Political divisions

South America
 Río Negro Province, Argentina
 Rio Negro, Paraná, a municipality in Brazil
 Rio Negro, Mato Grosso do Sul, a municipality in Brazil
 Río Negro, Chile, a city and commune in Osorno Province
 Río Negro, Palena, a town in Palena Province, Chile
 Rionegro, a city and municipality in Colombia
 Rionegro, Santander, a town and municipality in Colombia
 Rionegro Province, Colombia
 Río Negro Department, Uruguay
 Río Negro Municipality, Venezuela

Other continents
 Río Negro, Guatemala, a city

Other
Río Negro (newspaper), published in Argentina
Atlético Rio Negro Clube, a Brazilian football team from Manaus, Amazonas state
Rionegro (TransMilenio) a TransMilenio transportation system station in Bogotá, Colombia
Río Negro Massacre, Guatemala
Rio Negro tuco-tuco, a species of rodent
Río Negro National Park in Paraguay
Rio Negro Brush-tailed Rat, a species of rodent
Palácio Rio Negro, one of the official residences of the President of Brazil
Río Negro (film), a 1976 Cuban film
Río Negro Airport in Chile

See also

Black River (disambiguation)